The Four Mile River, also called the Tiropahi River, is a river in the Buller District of New Zealand. It arises in the Paparoa Range and flows north-west skirting the northern boundary of the Paparoa National Park to the Tasman Sea at Needle Point

References

Buller District
Rivers of the West Coast, New Zealand
Rivers of New Zealand